Jacob Summers (January 7, 1787 – July 25, 1863) was an American politician who served in the Michigan House of Representatives and Michigan Senate.

Biography 

Jacob Summers was born in New Jersey on January 7, 1787, the youngest of five sons of Jacob Summers and Mary Hiles. His father became a judge in Philadelphia, and Summers settled in Shelby, Michigan, in 1831, where he was a farmer.

Summers was elected as a Democrat to the Michigan House of Representatives in 1835 after the adoption of the state's first constitution. He later served six terms in the Michigan Senate. He served as a county supervisor in 1836, and was also an associate judge in Macomb County. He was described as "a man of strong mind, but uneducated, indolent and eccentric", and as an influential legislator.

In 1837, Summers was the director and president of a wildcat bank named the Bank of Utica. By the end of the following year, it was broke and was shut down.

He died on July 25, 1863.

Family 

Summers had nine children: Phebe, Ann, George, Barbara, Rebecca, David, John, Margaret, and William.

Notes

References 
 
 
 
 

1787 births
1863 deaths
Democratic Party members of the Michigan House of Representatives
Democratic Party Michigan state senators
19th-century American politicians